Vivian Jackson (14 August 1946 – 12 January 2010), better known as Yabby You (or sometimes Yabby U), was a reggae vocalist and producer, who came to prominence in the early 1970s through his uncompromising, self-produced work.

Biography
Jackson was born in the Waterhouse district of Kingston, Jamaica in 1946. One of seven children, Jackson left home at the age of twelve to find work at a furnace in Waterhouse. At seventeen, the effects of malnutrition had left him hospitalized, and on his release he was left with severe arthritis which had partially crippled his legs. His physical condition meant that he was unable to return to his previous work, and he was forced into hustling a living on the streets of Kingston.

His beliefs were markedly different from that of his Rastafarian contemporaries, believing in the divinity of Jesus rather than Haile Selassie I, earning him the nickname 'Jesus Dread'; This often prompted debate on religio-philosophical matters, and it was after one of these discussions that Jackson first headed towards a recording studio, having heard music "like a strange ting, inside a my thoughts – like an angel a sing".

Another spell in hospital meant that finding money for recording was difficult, but eventually the "Conquering Lion" single was released late in 1972, credited to 'Vivian Jackson and the Ralph Brothers'. Cut for King Tubby, the popularity of the song and its distinctive introduction (the chant of "Be-you, yabby-yabby-you") earned Jackson the nickname "Yabby You", which remained with him during his entire career.

The next few months saw the recording of several more singles, released under different names on various record labels, (although usually credited to 'Vivian Jackson and the Prophets', and often featuring a King Tubby 'version' on the b-side); culminating in the release of the Conquering Lion album. A King Tubby mixed dub set, King Tubby's Prophesy of Dub, was also issued, albeit on a limited run of 500 copies, helping to establish Jackson as a roots artist.

Yabby's success allowed him to branch out as a producer, and he began working with both upcoming and more established artists including Wayne Wade, Michael Rose, Tommy McCook, Michael Prophet, Big Youth, Trinity, Dillinger and Tapper Zukie, while continuing to release his own material.

Jackson continued to record, produce and perform (often with the aid of crutches) until the mid-1980s. He re-emerged in the early 1990s, issuing both new and old material, and his recordings have been the subject of several high quality reissues in recent years. In 2000 he released a singles remix project with Glen Brown. The album included remixes of "Conquering Lion" by Smith and Mighty, and a remix of Glen Brown by Small Axe and Terminal Head.

Shanachie Records released a three-CD box set in 2014. Shanachie Records chief Randall Grass explained in an interview with the website Midnight Raver:

On 14 August 2014, Shanachie Records announced their plans to release a Willi Williams/Yabby You project titled "Unification: From Channel One To King Tubbys With Willi Williams And Yabby You," which includes tracks recorded in the late seventies and never released.

Death
He died on 12 January 2010, aged 63, after suffering a ruptured brain aneurysm.

Discography
Conquering Lion (1975) Vivian Jackson (released as Ram A Dam in the UK, by Lucky)
Chant Down Babylon Kingdom (1977) Nationwide (reissued as King Tubby Meets Vivian Jackson)
Deliver Me from My Enemies (1977) Grove Music
Beware (1978) Grove Music (reissued (1991) ROIR)
 Jah Jah Way (1980) Island
African Queen (1980) Clappers
One Love One Heart (1983) Shanachie
Fleeing from the City (1991) Shanachie
Yabby The You Man (1995)
Jah Will Be Done  (1997) Prophet Records

Compilations
Jesus Dread 1972–1977 (1997), Blood and Fire
Deeper Roots (2012), Pressure Sounds – Yabby You & Brethren
Deeper Roots Part 2 (2014), Pressure Sounds – Yabby You & the Prophets

Compilation appearances
The Rough Guide to Reggae (1997), World Music Network
The Rough Guide to Dub (2005), World Music Network

Collaborations
King Tubby's Prophesy of Dub (1976) Prophets (reissued (1994) Blood and Fire)
Vocal & Dub (1979) Prophet (Yabby You and Michael Prophet)
Yabby You Meets Trinity at Dub Station (circa 1979) Yabby U (with Trinity)
Yabby You & Michael Prophet Meets Scientist at the Dub Station (1981) Prophet (with Michael Prophet and Scientist)
Time to Remember (1982) Prophet (with King Tubby)
Prophecy (1982) WLN (with Michael Prophet and Wayne Wade)
Yabby U Meets Sly & Robbie Along With Tommy McCook (1982) WLN (with Tommy McCook)
Yabby You Meets Mad Professor & Black Steel in Ariwa Studio (1993)

References

External links
Yabby You biography at Billboard.com
Yabby You at Roots Archives 

1946 births
2010 deaths
Musicians from Kingston, Jamaica
Dub musicians
Jamaican record producers
ROIR artists
Jamaican reggae musicians
Deaths from intracranial aneurysm
Island Records artists